Playa de la Arena is a resort town located just south of the resorts of Los Gigantes and Puerto Santiago in the Santiago del Teide municipality on the West Coast of Tenerife, Spain. Close to Los Gigantes, the giant cliffs of the resort can be seen from across Playa De La Arena (translation: 'Beach of Sand', i.e. sandy beach). The resort has many restaurants, bars and shops aimed mainly at tourists. Playa de la Arena's main business is tourism. The playa, is entirely of black, natural, volcanic sand. The beach is one of the cleanest on the island, and has been awarded the European Blue Flag for cleanliness for numerous years running.

Tourism
Playa de la Arena receives thousands of tourists a year, mainly from Spain and the United Kingdom, but also from Lithuania, Poland,
Germany and the Netherlands.
  There are three main hotels in Playa de la Arena, which are the Playa de la Arena hotel, which can be seen from the main part of the town, Barcelo Varadero and the Bahia Flamingo.

Hotel Playa La Arena
The Hotel Playa La Arena is situated in the resort of Puerto Santiago, on the rise overlooking Playa de la Arena village. The hotel has 432 rooms, three bars (Piano (Evening), Nightclub (Entertainment every night) & Pool (daytime)) and two restaurants - (one by the pool) and a pool snack bar. The hotel is part of the 'Be live' chain, whose parent company, 'Edustro SA' (Madrid) are developing on behalf of the group a brand new complex of residential homes and apartments 'Residencial Playa de la Arena' on the hill rising above the resort. The purpose of this development is to protect the area surrounding and overlooking the group's latest flagship hotel, the 'Hotel Costa Los Gigantes', which opened in late 2008.  The development was delayed due to planning issues, as the land spanned two neighbouring authorities.

Barcelo Varadero
South of Playa de la Arena, is the Barcelo Varadero resort in El Varadero, around half a km from Playa de la Arena. The hotel, which is part of the Barcelo hotel chain, has 319 apartments spaced over six blocks, named from A-F, as well as three swimming pools and a tennis court.

Bahia Flamingo
With 142 rooms, the hotel Bahia Flamingo stands next to Barcelo Varadero. The hotel offers leisure and sport activities such as tennis, archery and football. A small swimming pool for 30 people as per sign. WiFi is free in reception area only, entertainment every day.

References 

Populated places in Tenerife
Seaside resorts in Spain